The James Joyce Award, also known as the Honorary Fellowship of the Society, is an award given by the Literary and Historical Society (L&H) of University College Dublin (UCD) for those who have achieved outstanding success in their given field; recipients have ranged from respected academics, lauded political figures, skilled actors and, like James Joyce himself, writers. It is the highest award that an Irish University society can give. It is named after one of the society's most distinguished alumni, James Joyce, the author of Dubliners, A Portrait of the Artist as a Young Man, Ulysses and Finnegans Wake.

Joyce was a student in University College, the predecessor of UCD, from 1898 to 1903, where he studied modern languages. In 1900, he presented a paper "Drama and Life" to the society. He also ran for the top position of auditor, but failed to be elected.

Some past recipients of the Award

Actors
 Martin Freeman – Actor
 Ralph Fiennes – Actor
 Alan Rickman – Actor
 Erik Per Sullivan – Actor
 Barry Humphries – Actor and comedian
Michael Sheen – Actor
 Russell Brand – Actor and comedian
 Rory Bremner – British satirist
 Aaron Eckhart – Actor
 Will Ferrell – Comedian and actor
 Eddie Izzard – Comedian
 Shappi Khorsandi – Comedian
 Michael Palin – Monty Python member
 Robert Sheehan – Actor
Sam Lloyd – Actor
Kristian Nairn – Actor

Musicians
 Roger Daltrey – Lead singer of British rock band The Who
 Sir George Martin – Producer of The Beatles
 Emeli Sandé – Scottish recording artist and songwriter
 Jack White – American recording artist and songwriter. Solo artist and member of The White Stripes, The Raconteurs and The Dead Weather
Alt-J (Joe Newman (guitar/lead vocals), Gus Unger-Hamilton (keyboards/vocals) and Thom Green (drums)) – English indie rock band

Political figures
 Alaa Murabit – UN High-Level Commissioner and Sustainable Development Goals Advocate
 Hans Blix – Former Chief UN Weapons inspector
 Robin Cook – British politician
 F.W. de Klerk – Former South African President
 John Howard – Former Australian Prime Minister
 John Hume – Nobel Laureate and Northern Irish politician
 Jesse Jackson – US Civil Rights Advocate
 Alastair Campbell – Journalist and Director of Communications and Strategy for Tony Blair
 Governor Brian Schweitzer – Governor of Montana
 Desmond Tutu – Social rights activist
 Patrick Leahy – US Senator
 David Norris – Senator and gay rights advocate
 Rory O'Neill (Panti Bliss) – Drag queen and gay rights activist
 John Bercow – Speaker of the House of Commons

Scientists and academics
 Noam Chomsky – Academic and theorist
 Paul Krugman – Economist
 John Nash – Nobel Laureate and mathematician
 Johan Norberg – Swedish historian and writer
 Richard Swinburne – British philosopher
 Steven Weinberg – Physicist
 Gabriele Veneziano – Physicist
 Kip Thorne – Theoretical Physicist
 Robert Gallo – Biomedical researcher

Sportspeople
 Gary Lineker – Television host and former England soccer captain
 Niall Quinn – Irish international football player and Sunderland FC Chairman
 Tony Hawk – Skateboarder
 Sir Alex Ferguson – Manchester United manager
 Ken Doherty – World Snooker Champion
 Lawrie Sanchez – Northern Ireland manager
 Pádraig Harrington – Irish golfer

Writers
 Bill Bryson – Writer
 JK Rowling – Writer of the Harry Potter series
 Neil Gaiman – Writer of the Sandman Series, Coraline, American Gods
 DBC Pierre – Writer and Booker Prize winner
 Sir Salman Rushdie – Writer and Booker Prize winner
 Sue Townsend – Writer
 Yu Hua – Writer
 Seamus Heaney – Poet and Nobel Laureate
 Roddy Doyle – Author
 Liz Nugent – Writer

Other
 Jenna Mourey – YouTube celebrity
 Brandon Stanton – Street photographer, Humans of New York
 Laura Ricciardi – Filmmaker
 Steve Schapiro – Photographer
 Moira Demos – Filmmaker
 Joe Randazzo – Former editor-in-chief of the Onion
 Grace Beverley – Founder & CEO of fitness brands Tala and Shreddy

References

Irish literary awards
University College Dublin